Štitkovo is a village in the municipality of Nova Varoš, western Serbia. At the 2002 census, the village had a population of 130 people.

The village is home to a monument to Vuk Kalajitović, commander of the Mileševa Chetnik Corps during World War II.

References

Populated places in Zlatibor District